The 2020 CONCACAF Women's U-20 Championship was the 10th edition of the CONCACAF Women's U-20 Championship, the biennial international youth football championship organized by CONCACAF for the women's under-20 national teams of the North, Central American and Caribbean region. The tournament was held in the Dominican Republic between 22 February and 8 March 2020.

The final tournament is expanded from eight to 20 teams, using the same format as the 2019 CONCACAF U-17 Championship. The top two teams of the tournament would have qualified for the 2021 FIFA U-20 Women's World Cup (originally 2020 but postponed due to COVID-19 pandemic) in Costa Rica as the CONCACAF representatives, along with Costa Rica who would have automatically qualified as hosts. The U-20 Women's World Cup was initially to be co-hosted with Panama, but they backed out from co-hosting due to COVID-19 concerns, due to having the highest cases and deaths in the region. The fourth CONCACAF team to qualify, which would have initially been Panama, was not confirmed. However, FIFA announced on 17 November 2020 that this edition of the World Cup would be cancelled.

Mexico were the defending champions but was defeated by United States in the final.

Qualified teams

The qualifying format has changed since the 2018 edition, and the teams are no longer divided into regional zones.

The 41 CONCACAF teams were ranked based on the CONCACAF Women's Under-20 Ranking as of 2018. A total of 26 teams entered the tournament. The highest-ranked 16 entrants were exempt from qualifying and advanced directly to the group stage of the final tournament, while the lowest-ranked 10 entrants had to participate in the qualifying stage, where the four group winners and runners-up advanced to the round of 16 of the knockout stage of the final tournament.

On 13 January 2020, CONCACAF announced that Costa Rica and Panama, who had automatically qualified for the 2021 FIFA U-20 Women's World Cup as hosts, would no longer participate in the 2020 CONCACAF Women's U-20 Championship. As a result, the following changes to the tournament were made:
Guyana (Qualifying Group A winner) and Saint Kitts and Nevis (Qualifying Group B winner), enter the group stage instead of the round of 16.
Bermuda (Qualifying Group A third place) and Barbados (Qualifying Group B third place) enter the round of 16.

Venues

Draw
The draw for the group stage took place on 19 April 2019, 11:00 EDT (UTC−4), at the CONCACAF Headquarters in Miami. The 16 teams which entered the group stage were drawn into four groups of four teams. Based on the CONCACAF Women's Under-20 Ranking, the 16 teams were distributed into four pots, with teams in Pot 1 assigned to each group prior to the draw, as follows:

Following the exclusion of Costa Rica and Panama from the tournament, their vacated positions in the group stage were replaced by Guyana and Saint Kitts and Nevis respectively. Furthermore, the vacated positions in the round of 16 of Guyana and Saint Kitts and Nevis were replaced by Bermuda and Barbados respectively.

Squads

Players born on or after 1 January 2000 are eligible to compete. Each team must register a squad of 20 players, two of whom must be goalkeepers.

Match officials
CONCACAF announced the appointment of the match officials on 14 February 2020.

Group stage
The top three teams in each group advance to the round of 16, where they are joined by the four teams advancing from the qualifying stage.

Tiebreakers
The ranking of teams in each group is determined as follows (Regulations Article 12.8):
Points obtained in all group matches (three points for a win, one for a draw, zero for a loss);
Goal difference in all group matches;
Number of goals scored in all group matches;
Points obtained in the matches played between the teams in question;
Goal difference in the matches played between the teams in question;
Number of goals scored in the matches played between the teams in question;
Fair play points in all group matches (only one deduction could be applied to a player in a single match):
Yellow card: −1 points;
Indirect red card (second yellow card): −3 points;
Direct red card: −4 points;
Yellow card and direct red card: −5 points;
Drawing of lots.

All times are local, AST (UTC−4).

Group C

Group D

Group E

Group F

Knockout stage
In the knockout stage, if a match is level at the end of 90 minutes, extra time is played, and if still tied after extra time, the match is decided by a penalty shoot-out (Regulations Article 12.13).

Bracket

Round of 16

Quarter-finals

Semi-finals
Winners qualified for 2021 FIFA U-20 Women's World Cup.

Final

Winners

Goalscorers

Qualified teams for FIFA U-20 Women's World Cup
The following three teams from CONCACAF would have qualified for the 2021 FIFA U-20 Women's World Cup before the tournament was cancelled, including Costa Rica who would have qualified automatically as hosts. The fourth CONCACAF team to qualify for the 2021 FIFA U-20 Women's World Cup, which would initially have been co-hosts Panama (which had pulled out of hosting), was not confirmed.

1 Bold indicates champions for that year. Italic indicates hosts for that year.

Awards
The following awards were given at the conclusion of the tournament.

References

External links
Concacaf Women's Under-20 Championship, CONCACAF.com

 
2020
Women's U-20 Championship
2020 in women's association football
2020 in youth association football
2020 FIFA U-20 Women's World Cup qualification
International association football competitions hosted by the Dominican Republic
February 2020 sports events in North America
March 2020 sports events in North America